The Kingston International Championships also known as the Kingston International Invitation and the St. Andrew International Invitation  was a men's and women's clay court then later hard court tennis tournament established in 1932 as the Kingston International Tournament and first played at St. Andrews Club, then later Sabina Park, then at the Liguanea Club, Kingston,  St. Andrews Parish, Jamaica until 1970.

History
The Kingston International tournament was established in 1932 and first played at the St. Andrews Club, Kingston, Jamaica. It later moved to Sabina Park, Kingston, then later at the Liguanea Club, Kingston. In the 1960s the tournament was known as the St. Andrew International Invitation. In 1966 the first only Jamaican tennis player to win the mens event was Richard Russell when he defeated Arthur Ashe in three sets. The tournament was part Caribbean Circuit which was a major feature of the international tennis scene in from the 1930s to early 1970s. The tournament was staged annually until 1970 when it was discontinued.

Finals

Men's Singles
Incomplete roll
Results included:

Women's Singles
Incomplete roll

References

Clay court tennis tournaments
Hard court tennis tournaments
Defunct tennis tournaments in Jamaica